In woodworking, a sawbuck is a structure for holding wood so that it may be cut into pieces. Easily made in the field from rough material, it consists of an "X" form at each end which are joined by cross bars below the intersections of the X's. The wood to be cut is placed in the V's formed above the intersections of the X's.

A sawbuck should be heavy enough to negate any kickback from the saw while cutting. A sawbuck that is too light can result in injury as it may tip over while cutting, especially with a chainsaw.

In Canada and Britain, and the United States, a sawbuck is called a sawhorse or a sawstool, although this term also refers to a similar device used (often in pairs) to support wood planks.

United States ten-dollar bill 

"Sawbuck" is also a slang term for a U.S. $10 bill, derived from the similarity between the shape of a sawbuck device and the Roman numeral X (10), which formerly appeared on $10 bills.
However, there is some question as to whether this is accurate, as the phrase first appeared in print referring to the $10 bill.  A "double sawbuck" is a twenty dollar bill.

See also 
Sawbuck table

References

External links

Woodworking
Logging

de:Bock (Gestell)
no:Sagkrakk
sv:Sågbock